Progress 24 was a Soviet uncrewed Progress cargo spacecraft, which was launched in June 1985 to resupply the Salyut 7 space station.

Launch
Progress 24 launched on 21 June 1985 from the Baikonur Cosmodrome in the Kazakh SSR. It used a Soyuz-U rocket.

Docking
Progress 24 docked with the aft port of Salyut 7 on 23 June 1985 at 02:54 UTC, and was undocked on 15 July 1985 at 12:28 UTC.

Decay
It remained in orbit until 15 July 1985, when it was deorbited. The deorbit burn occurred at 22:33:31 UTC, with the mission ending at around 23:10 UTC.

See also

 1985 in spaceflight
 List of Progress missions
 List of uncrewed spaceflights to Salyut space stations

References

Progress (spacecraft) missions
1985 in the Soviet Union
Spacecraft launched in 1985
Spacecraft which reentered in 1985
Spacecraft launched by Soyuz-U rockets